The SIS Swiss International Schools are a group of 17 private day schools in Switzerland, Germany and Brazil offering continuous education from kindergarten through to college. As of 2020, more than 3,700 students are enrolled with the SIS.

SIS has been operating schools in Switzerland since 1999, in Germany since 2008, and in Brazil since 2011. It is a joint venture of Kalaidos Education Group (Switzerland) and Klett Group (Germany).

Schools in Switzerland

Schools in Germany

Schools in Brazil

References

External links 
SIS Worldwide
SIS Swiss International School Switzerland
 SIS Swiss International School Germany
 SIS Swiss International School Brazil
https://www.swissinternationalschool.ch/en-GB/Elternbereich

Private schools in Switzerland
Private schools in Germany
Private schools in Brazil
Swiss international schools in Brazil